The 1984 Lamar Cardinals football team represented Lamar University in the 1984 NCAA Division I-AA football season as a member of the Southland Conference.  The Cardinals played their home games at Cardinal Stadium now named Provost Umphrey Stadium in Beaumont, Texas.  Lamar finished the 1984 season with a 2–9 overall record and a 1–5 conference record.

Schedule

References

Lamar
Lamar Cardinals football seasons
Lamar Cardinals football